= Kodak EasyShare CX4200 =

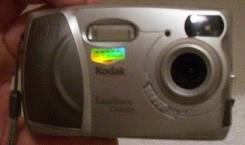
Kodak EasyShare CX4200

The Kodak CX4200 Digital Camera is a 2 megapixel digital camera made by the Eastman Kodak Company. It can take photos but not videos. The camera is fixed focus, but has a macro switch which will switch to a fixed closeup focus.
